Nikolai Andreyevich Fidirko (born 15 June 1987) is a retired Belarusian tennis player.

Fidirko has a career high ATP singles ranking of 610 achieved on 25 October 2010. He also has a career high ATP doubles ranking of 357 achieved on 30 August 2010.

Fidirko made his ATP main draw debut at the 2012 St. Petersburg Open in the singles draw facing Teymuraz Gabashvili.

He is the current coach of Aliaksandra Sasnovich

References

External links

1987 births
Living people
Belarusian male tennis players
Sportspeople from Olomouc
Tennis players from Minsk